is a Japanese anime television series produced by m.o.e. which parodies the genres of tokusatsu, kaiju, and superheroes; mainly themes from the Ultra Series and Kyodai Hero subgenre. It was broadcast in Japan from January 10, 2005, to March 28, 2005 and had a total of 12 episodes which ran for 13 minutes each. The series has been licensed in North America by Media Blasters and was released on September 2, 2014.

Plot
During one of the many monster attacks on the city where the story takes place, Silk Koharuno and her two friends attempt to get closer to the monster to get a better view. Unfortunately, the city's protector, UFO-man, comes to the rescue but inadvertently steps on them and crushes the girls to death. Feeling sorry for what he had done, UFO-man blames their deaths on the monster and promises to bring them back to life by lending them his power. However, now they must become the city's protectors as well.

Characters
 
 
 The main heroine of the trio.  Although very shy and reserved about her new duty, she is the first of the three to demonstrate their new powers as UFO-man's successor, growing into a giant heroine.  Only minutes after the transformation, she discovers her unusual battle suit is deteriorating little by little, until she is totally nude.  After she goes back to normal size in the first episode, Silk wears a costume of Yui's Element Suit from Corrector Yui which she borrows from Tsubomi. She has a crush on Tsubomi's older brother Makoto, her senior classmate and school photographer. She is referred to by the crowd as Hinnyu (Little Boobs).

 
 
 One of Silk's best friends.  She along with Silk and Tsubomi were accidentally crushed and resurrected by UFO-man.  Nervous about indecent exposure, she does not try her powers as an Ultimate Girl until Tsubomi fails in her first transformation and Silk refuses to do so again.  Left no choice, she offers to go, being dubbed Ultimate Girl Kyonyū (Big Boobs) by spectators.  When attempting to avoid exposing herself when her suit deteriorates, Vivienne is the first to learn how their powers are supposed to work, by being embarrassed, they generate an energy which can be projected as a weapon against the giant monsters. She has a secret crush on Silk. In a flashback showing her mother, it is revealed that she is a hafu, as her mother is White, possibly Russian.

 
 
 Silk and Vivienne's friend and classmate.  Tsubomi is a cosplayer by hobby, so when she realized that she too was a giant heroine, she took the idea without feeling any shame or embarrassment.  However, because of this attitude, she was basically useless, since the source of their strength comes from being thoroughly embarrassed and projecting that emotion into an energy that can defeat their giant adversaries.  Even after learning this, Tsubomi is not fazed and enjoys her new profession as a heroine and still manages to hold back the many giant monsters they encounter by tricking them instead of using brute power.  It was Tsubomi's idea to go by the name "Ultimate Girl." She is called "Loli" by the press, due to her underdeveloped chest.

 
 
 The giant hero who has always been fighting innumerous giant extraterrestrial monsters that rampage throughout Japan, until he accidentally steps on Silk, Vivienne, and Tsubomi.  Out of sympathy for the girls (while also blaming the monster for their deaths), he sacrifices much of his power and energy to resurrect the three of them.  In doing so, his body shrinks considerably, forcing him to rely on a UFO-like craft to levitate.  By giving the girls his power, they are forcibly pressed into serving as giant heroines in his stead, by changing his hover craft into a wand which they must grab in order to invoke the transformation process.

 
 Voiced by: Takashi Matsuyama
 A journalist who follows the UFO-man and Ultimate Girls story. He offered a reward for photos showing who the Ultimate Girls really were. Okamura is obsessed with the bodies of the Ultimate Girls.

 
 
 Tsubomi's older brother and a member of the high school press club as a photographer. He is always looking for photos of UFO-man, and is pursuing the reward offered for taking photos of the Ultimate Girls.

 
 
 Silk's older sister and a reporter working with Okamura

The Monsters
The monsters of the series are born by green alien slime fusing to human beings with the monsters representing their personalities. If the opal-like cores are destroyed or separated the monster will disintegrate into gold particles of light.

Gullmark: Appears in episode 1. Its only known power is having a highly articulate body. It is a homage to Gomess from Ultra Q.
Shupo: Appears in episodes 2 and 3. Its only known power is morphing into a steam engine train. It is a homage to King Joe from Ultra Seven.
Ochuusha: Appears in episode 4. Powers include a syringe on arms, super speed, and stethoscope on the pelvis. It is a homage to Baltan Seijin from the original Ultraman with characteristics of Zetton (also from Ultraman) and Metrojn Seijin (from Ultra Seven).
Megami Mask: Appears in episode 5. Powers include a pair of glue bazookas on the back, wrestling skills, and summonable steel armor. He is a reference to the editor of Megami Magazine, the magazine that publishes the Ultimate Girls manga and his mask is arguably a reference to Ultimate Muscle.
Hachiro: Appears in episode 6. His only known power is a boxing glove on him main pair of tentacles.
Mahler: Appears in episode 7. Powers include burrowing, emitting hypnotic waves from the giant metronome on its face, and a maestro wand. It is a homage to Mochiron from Ultraman Taro.
Dainioh: Appears in episodes 8 and 9. Powers include a club, a constricting bead necklace, a spare body, burrowing by spinning, swimming, and six extra arms in its body. It is a homage Majin from Daimajin.
Mushuusaa: Appears in episode 10. Powers include a pair of scythe arms and a whip tail. It is a homage to Gyaos and Gigan.
Giant Makato: Appears in episodes 11 and 12. He is a homage to super robots such as Mazinger Z and the guyver units from Bio Booster Armor Guyver.

Music
Opening Theme "White Heat" by Yozuca*
Ending Theme "3 Sentimental" by Misato Fukuen

Episodes

Reception
Tim Jones of THEM Anime Reviews said that the series is a "desperate attempt to be funny" if someone likes laughing at "innuendo and phallic imagery." He criticized the show's character designs, the behavior of the characters, and said the series "sucked from beginning to end" even as he praised the series opening song, but called most of the music in the series "lame and forgettable" and said the voice acting is "weak." He further said that the anime has a lot of "underage fan service," most of which are naked girls, and called it a "dirty, dirty show."

References

External links
 

2005 Japanese novels
2005 manga
Anime with original screenplays
Dengeki Bunko
Dengeki Comic Gao!
Light novels
Parody anime and manga
School life in anime and manga
Science fiction anime and manga
Superheroes in anime and manga
Shōnen manga